The Fifth Patient is a 2007 American thriller film written and directed by Amir Mann, and starring Nick Chinlund and Marley Shelton. The film was shot in the United States and Mexico, and released on June 10, 2007.

Plot

John Reilly, an American national, finds himself in an African hospital where, he learns he has spent the last two years due to a head injury. He remembers nothing of his past and is accused of being a spy. The film features Helen, a woman Reilly believes might be his wife.

Cast and characters
 Nick Chinlund – John Reilly
 Isaach De Bankolé – Cpt. Mugambe
 Brendan Fehr – Vince Callow
 Marley Shelton – Helen
 Harsh Nayyar – Apu
 Edi Gathegi – Darudi
 Alec Newman – Dr. Stevenson
 Olek Krupa – Khodorov
 Henry Czerny – Gerard Pinker
 Peter Bogdanovich – Edward Birani

See also
 Cinema of the United States
 List of American films of 2007

External links
 
 
 The Fifth Patient - Shoreline Entertainment

2007 films
2007 thriller films
American thriller films
2000s English-language films
2000s American films